Carlos M. N. Eire is the T. Lawrason Riggs Professor of History and Religious Studies at Yale University. He is a historian of late medieval and early modern Europe.

Education  

Eire received his Bachelor of Arts in History and Theology in 1973 from Loyola University, Chicago. He obtained his doctoral degree from Yale University in 1979.

Career 

Before joining the Yale faculty in 1996, Eire taught at St. John's University in Minnesota and the University of Virginia, and spent two years at the Institute for Advanced Study in Princeton.

He is the author of War Against the Idols (Cambridge, 1986), From Madrid to Purgatory (Cambridge, 1995), A Very Brief History of Eternity (Princeton, 2009), and Reformations: Early Modern Europe 1450-1700 (Yale, 2016), for which he received the R.R. Hawkins Award for best book and the American Publishers Awards for Professional & Scholarly Excellence of 2017.  He is also co-author of Jews, Christians, Muslims: An Introduction to Monotheistic Religions (Prentice Hall, 1997).  His memoir of the Cuban Revolution,  Waiting for Snow in Havana (Free Press, 2003), won the U.S. National Book Award for Nonfiction and has been translated into many languages. A second memoir, Learning to Die in Miami (November 2010) focuses on the early years of his exile in the United States.

Personal life 

Carlos Eire was born in Havana, Cuba, on 23 November 1950. His mother was Maria Azucena Eiré González and his father was Antonio Nieto Cortadellas - a prominent judge before Fidel Castro's revolution. He also has two brothers, Tony (blood relative), and Ernesto (step-brother); the latter was disliked by all in the family, but the father.

Eire (age 11) and his brother Tony fled to the United States in 1962, becoming another statistic of the 14,000 unaccompanied Cuban children airlifted by Operation Peter Pan. His mother would eventually join him a few years later, but never his father.

Eire married his wife, Jane Vanderlyn Ulrich, in January 1984. They have three children, John-Carlos (b. 1988), Evelyn Grace (b. 1990), and Bruno Rowan (b. 1994).

Bibliography

See also
 Cuban American literature
 List of Cuban-American writers

References

External links
 Focus 580; Waiting for Snow in Havana: Confessions of A Cuban Boy,” 2004-05-04, WILL Illinois Public Media, American Archive of Public Broadcasting

1950 births
Living people
Yale University faculty
University of Virginia faculty
Historians of Europe
Reformation historians
Cuban emigrants to the United States
American writers of Cuban descent
National Book Award winners
20th-century American historians
American male non-fiction writers
21st-century American historians
20th-century American male writers